Albert Leonard Rosen (February 29, 1924 – March 13, 2015), nicknamed "Flip" and "The Hebrew Hammer", was an American baseball third baseman and right-handed slugger for the Cleveland Indians of Major League Baseball for ten seasons in the 1940s and 1950s.

After serving for four years in the U.S. Navy during World War II, Rosen played his entire ten-year career (–) with the Cleveland Indians in the American League (AL).  A stand-out on both offense and defense, he drove in 100 or more runs five consecutive years, was a four-time All-Star, twice led the league in home runs and twice in runs batted in (RBIs), and was an AL Most Valuable Player. Rosen was a .285 career hitter, with 192 home runs and 717 RBIs in 1,044 games. He was selected for the All-Star Game from 1952 to 1955. Rosen appeared on the cover of Sports Illustrated in 1955.

Following two decades as a stockbroker upon retirement from baseball, Rosen returned to the game as a top front office executive in the late 1970s, serving the New York Yankees, Houston Astros, and San Francisco Giants variously as president, CEO, and general manager. Regarded as a GM who still thought like a player, he became the only former MVP to also earn baseball's Executive of the Year award.

Early life
Rosen was born in Spartanburg, South Carolina to Louis and Rose (née Levin) Rosen. His father left the family shortly thereafter, and Rosen's mother and grandmother moved the family to Miami, Florida, when he was 18 months old.

Rosen suffered from asthma as a child, which prompted his family to move further south.  While growing up, his two favorite baseball players were Lou Gehrig and Hank Greenberg. He attended Riverside Elementary School, Ada Merritt Junior High School, and then Miami Senior High School for a year before attending Florida Military Academy in St. Petersburg, Florida, on a boxing scholarship.  After graduating from Florida Military Academy, Rosen enrolled in the University of Florida in Gainesville, Florida.  He left the university after a semester to play minor league baseball in North Carolina.

Rosen enlisted in 1942, and spent four years in the U.S. Navy fighting in the Pacific during World War II, delaying his professional baseball career. He navigated an assault boat in the Battle of Okinawa. He left the Navy as a lieutenant the following year, returning to baseball.

Minor league career
Rosen played for the  Pittsfield Electrics, where he was initially given a back-up role. Upon leading the Canadian–American League in home runs (16) and RBIs (86), while batting .323, however, he was bestowed his idol Hank Greenberg's nickname, the "Hebrew Hammer". He led all hitters in average (.349), hits (186), doubles (47), extra-base hits (83), RBIs (141), total bases (330), slugging percentage (.619), and on-base percentage (.437). He won the Texas League Player of the Year Award. Rosen played for the New York Yankees' Kansas City Blues farm team in 1948. He was loaned to the Blues for the duration of the team's American Association season as part of a deal that sent reliever Charley Wensloff from the Yankees to the Indians. Rosen was named Rookie of the Year in the American Association for his play with the Blues.

Major League Baseball career
In 1948, Rosen played most of the year in minor leagues with the Kansas City Blues, before joining the Indians in September. He played in the 1948 World Series as a reserve behind regular third baseman Ken Keltner despite only playing five games during the season after the Indians requested his inclusion on the World Series roster. It stood as the AL rookie record until Mark McGwire surpassed it in 1987. He homered in four straight games in June, a feat unmatched by an Indians rookie until Jason Kipnis in 2011. Rosen averaged a league-best homer every 15.0 at bats, and led the league as well in HBP (10). He batted .287 and had 116 runs batted in, while finishing fifth in the league with 100 walks and a .543 slugging percentage. His 100 walks remained a team rookie record for a right-handed batter, through 2014. He also remained the most recent AL rookie to record at least 100 walks until Aaron Judge in 2017. Despite his home run title, he finished 17th in the American League MVP Award voting.

In  Rosen led the league in games played, and was fifth in the league in RBIs (102), extra-base hits (55), and walks (85). He batted .265, with 24 home runs. Rosen hit four grand slams, a team season record that was not broken until Travis Hafner hit five in 2006.

He also was third in the league in runs (101) and slugging percentage (.524), fifth in hits (171) and doubles (32), sixth in home runs (28), and seventh in batting average (.302). On April 29, he matched the then team record of three home runs in one game, which was surpassed only when Rocky Colavito tied the Major League single-game record with four home runs on June 10, 1959. Rosen came in tenth in the American League MVP Award voting.

In , Rosen led the American League in home runs (43), runs batted in (145), runs (115), slugging percentage (.613), and total bases (367). He also came in second in OBP, and third in hits (201), and tied for eighth in stolen bases. He also had a 20-game hitting streak. Defensively, he had the best range factor of all third basemen in the league (3.32), and led it in assists (338) and double plays (38). His RBI total is still the most for an Indians third baseman, through 2017, and is fourth most for any Indian in a season.

He batted .336, and missed winning the batting title – and with it the Triple Crown – on the last day of the season, by just over one percentage point. He was elected American League MVP by a unanimous vote, the first to be elected unanimously since the original "Hebrew Hammer", Hank Greenberg.

In Bill James' New Historical Baseball Abstract, Rosen's 1953 season is called the greatest ever by a third baseman. It is ranked 164th overall, and 48th best by a position player by Baseball-Reference.com as of Rosen's passing.

In  he hit an even .300, led the league in sacrifice flies with 11, was fourth in SLG (.506), and fifth in home runs (24), RBI (102), and OBP (.404). He also hit consecutive home runs in the All-Star game despite a broken finger, earning him the game MVP. His five RBI in the game matched the record set by Ted Williams five years earlier, which still stood through the 2011 season.

Hall of Fame manager Casey Stengel said of him: "That young feller, that feller's a ball player. He'll give you the works every time. Gets all the hits, gives you the hard tag in the field. That feller's a real competitor, you bet your sweet curse life."  Cleveland won the pennant, but lost the World Series. In spite of Rosen's 5th straight year with 100 or more RBIs Cleveland cut his $42,500 ($ today) salary to $37,500 ($ today) for 1955.

In  Rosen finished in the top ten in the league in at-bats per home run, walks, and sacrifice flies. By 1956, back problems and leg injuries caught up with Rosen and he retired at age 32 at the end of the season.

Stockbroker
After retiring in  Rosen became a stockbroker, an occupation he pursued for the next 22 years.

Baseball executive
In 1978 Rosen became President/CEO of the Yankees. They won the 1978 World Series, but Rosen quit in July 1979. Tommy John thought he left because owner George Steinbrenner had replaced Bob Lemon, a friend of Rosen's, with Billy Martin as the team manager a month before. Rosen then served as President/CEO of the Astros (1980–85), then president and general manager of the Giants (1985–92). Regarded as a GM who still thought like a player, he became the only MVP in history to also earn the top executive award.

In 1979, Rosen appeared with Spec Richardson (general manager of the San Francisco Giants) in a television commercial entitled "Baseball Executives" for Miller Lite, as one of the commercials in the legendary "Great Taste, Less Filling" advertising campaign. The idea was two major league high-level baseball executives are discussing a big trade in a formal, stuffy members only club, only to reveal that they are actually trading baseball cards much like a couple of children, ending on a throw-down of a bunch of baseball cards on the polished wooden table. The commercial ran heavily during the summer of 1979 along with every game of the World Series that year.

Personal life
Rosen's wife of 19 years, the former Teresa Ann Blumberg, died on May 3, 1971. He remarried to second wife, Rita (née Kallman) several years later. He had three sons, and a stepson and stepdaughter. Rosen occasionally consulted for baseball teams, including a stint with the Yankees as special assistant to the general manager in 2001 and 2002. He was featured in the 2010 movie narrated by Dustin Hoffman, Jews and Baseball: An American Love Story.

Rosen died on March 13, 2015, in Rancho Mirage, California.

Jewish heritage
Rosen was Jewish. He was tough, an amateur boxer, and had a reputation for standing up to anyone who dared insult his ancestry. While some reports have him commenting that, as a minor leaguer, he wished his name were something less obviously Jewish, he is later known to have remarked that he wished it were more Jewish—something like Rosenstein.  When Ed Sullivan, himself a Catholic with a Jewish wife, suggested that Rosen might be Catholic, pointing to his habit of drawing a "cross" in the dirt with his bat, Rosen said the mark was an "x" and told Sullivan he wished his name were more Jewish so he wouldn't be mistaken for Catholic.

Once a White Sox opponent called him a "Jew bastard". Sox pitcher Saul Rogovin, also Jewish, remembered an angry Rosen striding belligerently to the dugout and challenging the "son of a bitch" to a fight. The player backed down.

Rosen challenged another opposing player who had "slurred [his] religion" to fight him under the stands. And during a game, when Red Sox bench player Matt Batts taunted Rosen with anti-Semitic names, Rosen called time and left his position on the field to confront Batts. Hank Greenberg recalled that Rosen "want[ed] to go into the stands and murder" fans who hurled anti-Semitic insults at him.

A 2010 documentary, Jews and Baseball: An American Love Story, highlighted Rosen, who in it is frank about how he dealt with anti-Semitism: "There's a time that you let it be known that enough is enough. ... You flatten [them]."

During his career, Rosen refused to play on the High Holy Days, as would baseball Hall of Famer Sandy Koufax, arguably the most famous American Jewish baseball player. In a 1976 Esquire magazine article, sportswriter Harry Stein published an "All Time All-Star Argument Starter", consisting of five ethnic baseball teams. Rosen was the third baseman on Stein's Jewish team.
Through 2014, he was fifth in career home runs (behind Sid Gordon), seventh in RBIs (behind Ryan Braun), and tenth in hits (behind Mike Lieberthal) among all-time Jewish major league baseball players.

Awards
 Member of the Cleveland Indians Hall of Fame.
 Member of the National Jewish Sports Hall of Fame (1980).
 Member of the International Jewish Sports Hall of Fame.
 Member of the Texas League Hall of Fame.

See also

Cleveland Indians all-time roster
List of Florida Gators baseball players
List of New York Yankees owners and executives
List of select Jewish baseball players
List of Major League Baseball players who spent their entire career with one franchise

References

Further reading
  This chapter in Ruttman's history, based on a January 14, 2009, interview with Rosen conducted for the book, discusses Rosen's American, Jewish, baseball, and life experiences from youth to the present.

External links

1924 births
2015 deaths
American League All-Stars
American League home run champions
American League Most Valuable Player Award winners
American League RBI champions
United States Navy personnel of World War II
Jewish American military personnel
United States Navy officers
American stockbrokers
Baseball players from Miami
Baseball players from South Carolina
Cleveland Indians players
Houston Astros executives
Jewish American baseball managers
Jewish American baseball players
Jewish Major League Baseball players
Kansas City Blues (baseball) players
Major League Baseball general managers
Major League Baseball team presidents
Major League Baseball third basemen
New York Yankees executives
Oklahoma City Indians players
Pittsfield Electrics players
San Diego Padres (minor league) players
San Francisco Giants executives
Sports coaches from Miami
Sportspeople from Spartanburg, South Carolina
Thomasville Tommies players
Miami Senior High School alumni
21st-century American Jews